Anolis gemmosus, O'Shaughnessy's anole or Andes anole, is a species of lizard in the family Dactyloidae. The species is found in Colombia and Ecuador.

References

Anoles
Reptiles of Colombia
Reptiles of Ecuador
Reptiles described in 1875
Taxa named by Arthur William Edgar O'Shaughnessy